Since 2018, 131 songs have been certified in South Korea in accordance with the certification levels set up by the Korea Music Content Association (KMCA). Established in 2008, the KMCA introduced the official South Korean charts in 2010 and record certifications were implemented in April 2018. Every song released after January 1, 2018, is eligible for a certification. The KMCA divides certification for songs in streaming and downloads. For songs released before 2018, Gaon published the Gaon Observation Board that record songs that reach 100 million streams and 2.5 million downloads.

The first song to be certified Platinum for both streams and downloads was iKon's "Love Scenario" in June and November 2018. Paul Kim's "Every Day, Every Moment" is the highest certified song in both categories. Anne-Marie's "2002" was the first non-Korean language song to be certified.

Certification levels

Certified songs

See also 

 List of best-selling singles in South Korea
 List of music recording certifications
 List of certified albums in South Korea

Notes

References

South Korea
South Korean music-related lists
South Korea songs